The 1980 Pittsburgh Steelers season was the franchise's 48th season in the National Football League.

The Steelers struggled for the first time in many years. The aging defense was not as effective as it had been in the 1978 and '79 seasons, falling from 2nd to 15th in yards allowed. The Steelers also surrendered 313 points, ranked 15th in the league, compared to 262 points (5th in the league) the previous season. The Pittsburgh defense only garnered 18 quarterback sacks. 

The offense was still plagued with 42 total turnovers, but ranking 6th in total offense, and scoring 352 points. 

Despite the team's troubles, the Steelers could have again obtained home-field advantage throughout the playoffs had they not lost several close games, including games against Cincinnati and Cleveland in which they lost despite having large leads in the fourth quarter. Pittsburgh remained in the playoff hunt until a 28–13 loss to Buffalo in week 12 and then a 6–0 loss to Houston effectively eliminated Pittsburgh from the postseason. 

To many, these two losses marked the end of the Steeler Dynasty. Several key players retired after the 1980 season and the team was never the same again. The 1980 season was the first in which the Steelers did not qualify for the playoffs since 1971.

Offseason

NFL draft

Personnel

Staff

Roster

Preseason

Schedule

Regular season

Schedule

Game summaries

Week 1: vs. Houston Oilers 
The Steelers sat on a 17-0 first quarter lead and then had to score twice in the final 13 minutes to fight off a Houston comeback as Terry Bradshaw accounted for three of the Steelers four touchdowns. Larry Anderson provided the early fireworks when he returned the opening kickoff for 63 yards. The Steelers went on to score three of the four possessions but realized only three points as a result of four interceptions by Ken Stabler passes the first six times Houston has the ball. The Oilers got the 17 points back in the third quarter. Trailing 17-3, they scored two touchdowns in a span of 97 seconds. Earl Campbell's first pass, a sidearm wobbler, got the first score and when Theo Bell fumbled the next kickoff, Houston tied the game six plays later. Four Bradshaw passes ate up 72 of the 80-yard drive to get the Steelers back on top. A broken play on which John Stallworth outfought two defenders for a high Bradshaw lob was the final score of the game. Franco Harris passes  Jim Taylor to become the third leading rusher in NFL history with 8,609 yards. Mel Blount and Donnie Shell had two interceptions each and Mike Wagner got the fifth.

Week 2: at Baltimore Colts

Week 3: at Cincinnati Bengals

Week 4: vs. Chicago Bears

Week 5: at Minnesota Vikings

Week 6: vs. Cincinnati Bengals

Week 7 : vs. Oakland Raiders

Week 8: at Cleveland Browns

Week 9: vs. Green Bay Packers

Week 10: at Tampa Bay Buccaneers

Week 11: vs. Cleveland Browns

Week 12: at Buffalo Bills

Week 13: vs. Miami Dolphins

Week 14 : at Houston Oilers

Week 15: vs. Kansas City Chiefs

Week 16: at San Diego Chargers

Standings

References

External links 
 1980 Pittsburgh Steelers season at ProFootballReference.com
 1980 Pittsburgh Steelers at jt-sw.com

Pittsburgh Steelers seasons
Pittsburgh Steelers
Pitts